The 1997–98 Buffalo Sabres season was the 28th season for the National Hockey League franchise that was established on May 22, 1970.

Off-season

Regular season
On March 19, 1998, the Sabres scored three short-handed goals in a 6–1 win over the Florida Panthers.

The Sabres finished the regular season with 13 shutouts, the most in the NHL.

Season standings

Schedule and results

Playoffs

Eastern Conference Quarterfinals

Eastern Conference semifinals

Eastern Conference finals

Player statistics

Regular season
Scoring

Goaltending

Playoffs
Scoring

Goaltending

Note: Pos = Position; GP = Games played; G = Goals; A = Assists; Pts = Points; +/- = plus/minus; PIM = Penalty minutes; PPG = Power-play goals; SHG = Short-handed goals; GWG = Game-winning goals
      MIN = Minutes played; W = Wins; L = Losses; T = Ties; GA = Goals-against; GAA = Goals-against average; SO = Shutouts; SA = Shots against; SV = Shots saved; SV% = Save percentage;

Awards and records
 Hart Memorial Trophy: || Dominik Hasek,
 Lester B. Pearson Award: || Dominik Hasek
 Vezina Trophy: || Dominik Hasek
 Dominik Hasek, Goaltender, NHL First Team All-Star

NHL All-Star Game
 Dominik Hasek, World Team

Transactions

Draft picks

References
 Sabres on Hockey Database

Buffalo Sabres seasons
B
B
Buffalo
Buffalo